Aydin Aghdashloo (born October 30, 1940) is an Iranian painter, graphist, art curator, writer, and film critic.

Early life and education 
Aydin Aghdashloo, the son of Mohammad-Beik Aghdashloo (Haji Ouf) and Nahid Nakhjevan, was born on October 30, 1940, in the Afakhray neighborhood of Rasht. His father was an Azerbaijani Turk and a member of Azerbaijan Equality Party and his family assumes their surname from the small town of Agdash. After seeing Aydin's talent in painting at school and his hand-made models, Mohammad-Beik took him to Habib Mohammadi, a painter and a teacher from Rasht.

In 1959, at the age of 19, after successfully passing the university entrance examination, he enrolled at Tehran University's School of Fine Arts. In 1967, unable to complete his studies after eight years, he dropped out of college.

Works 
In 1975, Aghdashloo held his first individual exhibition at Iran-America Society in Tehran. The exhibited paintings were mostly about floating things, dolls and some works about the Renaissance.
Between 1976 and 1979, Aghdashloo helped open and launch Museums Abghineh va Sofalineh, Reza Abbasi Museum and Contemporary Arts in Tehran and also Kerman and Khorram-Abad Museums.

Aghdashloo was the holder and coordinator of several exhibitions after the Iranian revolution. While none of them were special exhibitions of his works, they played an important role in introducing contemporary Iranian art to the people inside and outside Iran. He took multiple exhibitions from Iran to other countries, including "Iranian Art, since the Past until Today" in China, "Past Iranian Art" in Japan, and the contemporary Iranian paintings with a traditional background sent to Bologna, Italy. Aghdashloo is also a recipient of the Legion of Honour.

Aghdashloo's interest in including surreal spaces in his works and painting floating objects began in his 30 years of age. During the period, his works were of floating objects having a shadow on the ground. In a surrealistic environment, he painted dolls having no faces influenced by Gergeo Deki Riko and they later became a large part of his series "Years of Fire and Snow". According to him, painting of such faceless dolls helped him say the subconscious suspicious and illusive word in the form of a painting.

After the 1979 revolution and the eight-year war, most of Aghdashloo's works were about memorials and objects proceeding to doom and damage; abandoned huts and views, green wooden rotten windows with broken glasses, old doors with rusted locks, and deadly blades as symbols of missiles hitting the cities; all of them showed the painter's thinking of gradual doom and damage as the passing of hard times. Using Iranian miniature continued in his works and he used every Iranian classic style and space for transferring his subjective concepts about the contemporary world.

Aghdashloo paints most of his works by gouache on canvas.

Bahram Beyzai writes in a part of his article: "Why shouldn't I be rude and say that if there's a value in copy-painting, the patterns of the previous celebrities of painting and visualizing aren't in our reach; so that as evaluation criteria, they can testify for the level of accomplishment of those masters in copy-painting; but their works, which Aydin has remade, are a proof of Aydin's skill in copy-painting. It's obvious that copy-painting wasn't all of their art, as it's not all of Aydin's. It's Aydin's imagination and time-sighting and death-aware thought that's the final maker of his work. The crevices that time has made in the paintings, and the oppressions that the cosmos – or man's hand – has inflicted upon them. In Aydin's repaintings, these masters' praise are accompanied with sorrow for their own and their works' mortality."

In a ceremony that was held in French embassy in Iran on Tuesday, January 12, 2016, Aghdashloo received the Legion of Honour.

Controversy

Allegations of sexual misconduct 
On August 22, 2020, Sara Omatali, a former reporter publicly stated that during an encounter in late 2006, Aydin Aghdashloo forcibly grabbed her and kissed her in his office, where they had met for an interview. On August 27, 2020, Aghdashloo issued English and Persian public statements denying the allegations and expressing his support for women's movements, stating that false accusations made it difficult for real victims to seek justice.

Barbad Golshiri, son of Iranian author Houshang Golshiri, announced that the new edition of his father's novel, Prince Ehtejab, would not include Aghdashloo's painting. Bahman Kiarostami, documentary filmmaker and son of the acclaimed filmmaker, Abbas Kiarostami, defended Golshiri's action as a "declaration of support for a social movement", and a legal verdict was irrelevant "because of the obvious: in the words of Leonard Cohen and Asghar Farhadi, 'everybody knows'." Aghdashloo's behaviour, Kiarostami added, was no longer tolerable "in the face of a mass social movement."

Fahime Khezr Heidari, a journalist based in Washington, D.C., said Omatali was "one of the most ethical people" she knew and added that she had heard a "dozen" similar cases against Aghdashloo. , a former Iranian film and television actress tweeted that she was a student of Aghdashloo's for two years in the early 1990s and though she was never subjected to Aghdashloo's sexual misconducts, yet she could confirm that sexual misconducts appeared to be a natural part of Aghdashloo's life.

Investigation in The New York Times 
On October 22, 2020, Farnaz Fassihi published two months worth of investigations, interviewing alleged victims of Aghdashloo in The New York Times. The investigation included 13 women who accused Aghdashloo of sexual abuse, including one who was underage. The report documented victims comparing Aghdashloo to Harvey Weinstein:

Personal life 
He was previously married to architect Firouzeh "Fay" Athari in 1981. Together they had two children, Takin and Tara Aghdashloo. From 1972 until 1980, his first marriage was to actress Shohreh Aghdashloo (née Vaziri-Tabar), and they did not have children.

See also 
 List of Iranian painters

References

External links 
 Aydin Aghdashloo's Official Website
 Ali Dehbāshi, Aghdashloo, a passer-by by the side of the wall (Aghdashloo, āberi dar kenār-e divār), in Persian, Jadid Online, January 30, 2009, .  • Aghdashloo: Living to Paint, in English, Jadid Online, May 14, 2009, .  • Audio slideshow by Shokā Sahrā'i, in Persian (with English subtitles), Jadid Online, 2009:  (7 min 6 sec).

Iranian painters
Contemporary painters
Iranian graphic designers
Iranian art critics
Iranian people of Azerbaijani descent
People from Rasht
1940 births
Living people
Iranian poster artists
Iranian watercolourists
Iranian contemporary artists
Iranian art writers
20th-century Iranian people
21st-century Iranian people